Kuldeep Singh Pathania (born 17 September 1957) is an Indian politician and member of the Indian National Congress, He is the current Speaker of the Himachal Pradesh Legislative Assembly.

Personal life 
Pathania was born in the village of Chhalara in the Chamba district of Himachal Pradesh. He holds a B.Sc and a LL.B degree, which he received from Lucknow University and Himachal Pradesh University, respectively. He is married to Smt. Menna Pathania and has one son. Pathania is both an advocate and an agriculturist.

Political career 
During his college years, Pathania was an active member of the NSUI, where he worked to promote social harmony and combat inequity. He also provided free legal aid to those in need. Pathania has held several leadership positions within the Congress party, including President of the Block Youth Congress, Senior Vice-President of the Chamba District Congress Committee, and Member of the Pradesh Congress Committee (PCC). Pathania has been elected to the state legislative assembly four times, first in 1985 on the Congress ticket, and subsequently in 1993 and 2003 as an independent candidate. He has served as the Chairman of the Committees on Public Undertakings (1994-1998) and Subordinate Legislations (2003-2007), and has been a member of various House committees, including the Estimates, P.A.C, and P.U.C. He has also served as a member of various apex government committees, and was the Chairman of the State Finance Commission from 2003-2007. In December 2007, Pathania was elected to the legislative assembly for a fourth term. He also remained chairman of Himachal Pradesh State Pollution Control Board from 2012-2017. He was re-elected the legislative assembly in December 2022. On January 5, 2023, he was unanimously elected as the Speaker of the Himachal Pradesh Legislative Assembly.

References

Himachal Pradesh MLAs 2022–2027
Indian National Congress politicians from Himachal Pradesh
1957 births
Living people
People from Chamba, Himachal Pradesh
Speakers of the Himachal Pradesh Legislative Assembly
Himachal Pradesh MLAs 1985–1990
Himachal Pradesh MLAs 1993–1998